Dadhar Mirza is a village of Rawalpindi District, Punjab, Pakistan.

Populated places in Rawalpindi District